Andrew Rymarczuk (1951 – February 23, 1997) is a former U.S. soccer forward.  He played three seasons in the North American Soccer League and at least one in the American Soccer League.  He also earned five caps with the U.S. national team in 1973.

Youth
Rymarczuk attended North Catholic High School where he was a 1st team All-Catholic player and a member of the 1967 Championship team.  A 1969 graduate, he was posthumously inducted into the North Catholic Soccer Hall of Fame in 2009.  He attended Penn State where he played on the men's soccer team from 1969 to 1972.  He was a third team All American in 1971 and a 1972 first team All American.  He scored thirty goals and added nineteen assists during his four years with the Nittany Lions.

Club career
The Rochester Lancers of the North American Soccer League (NASL) drafted Rymarczuk in the first round of the 1973 NASL College Draft.  He spent three seasons with the Lancers before being acquired by the expansion Tacoma Tides of the American Soccer League in 1976.  The Tides folded at the end of the season.

National team
His first cap came on September 9, 1973, in a 1–0 win over Bermuda.  He came on for Barry Barto.  He gained his first start on November 5, 1973, a 1–0 loss to Haiti.  His last game was a November 15, 1973, loss to Israel.  He later played in an unofficial match, a 10–0 loss to Italy on April 2, 1975.

References

External links
 Tacoma Tides profile
 NASL stats

1951 births
1997 deaths
American soccer players
American Soccer League (1933–1983) players
North American Soccer League (1968–1984) players
Penn State Nittany Lions men's soccer players
Rochester Lancers (1967–1980) players
Tacoma Tides players
United States men's international soccer players
All-American men's college soccer players
Association football forwards
Soccer players from Philadelphia